Marcelo Macedo Ferreira (born February 1, 1983 in Petrópolis), or simply Marcelo Macedo, is a Brazilian attacking midfielder. He currently plays for Serrano.

Career
He has also from July 2008 to December 2008 played for Panserraikos on loan from Tombense-MG.

Honours
Rio de Janeiro State League: 2002
South Korean Cup: 2004

Contract
Tombense 1 January 2008 to 31 December 2010
Ipatinga (Loan) 1 January 2008 to 31 December 2011

References

External links
CBF 

furacao 
furacao profile 

1983 births
Living people
People from Petrópolis
Brazilian footballers
Brazilian expatriate footballers
Brazilian expatriate sportspeople in South Korea
Expatriate footballers in South Korea
Expatriate footballers in Greece
Expatriate footballers in Mexico
Expatriate footballers in Colombia
Campeonato Brasileiro Série A players
Campeonato Brasileiro Série B players
Liga MX players
K League 1 players
Fluminense FC players
Seongnam FC players
Esporte Clube Juventude players
Atlas F.C. footballers
CR Flamengo footballers
Madureira Esporte Clube players
Club Athletico Paranaense players
Tombense Futebol Clube players
Ipatinga Futebol Clube players
Panserraikos F.C. players
Figueirense FC players
Duque de Caxias Futebol Clube players
Macaé Esporte Futebol Clube players
Guarani FC players
Mogi Mirim Esporte Clube players
Boa Esporte Clube players
Paulista Futebol Clube players
Atlético Junior footballers
Botafogo Futebol Clube (SP) players
Clube de Regatas Brasil players
Mirassol Futebol Clube players
Esporte Clube Flamengo players
Serrano Football Club players
Association football midfielders
Sportspeople from Rio de Janeiro (state)